Wild, Wild Susan is a 1925 American silent comedy film directed by A. Edward Sutherland and starring popular Bebe Daniels. Famous Players-Lasky produced and Paramount Pictures distributed.

Cast

Preservation
With no prints of Wild, Wild Susan located in any film archives, it is a lost film.

References

External links

Lobby poster
Lobby card

1925 films
American silent feature films
Lost American films
Films directed by A. Edward Sutherland
Films based on short fiction
Paramount Pictures films
Silent American comedy films
American black-and-white films
1925 comedy films
1925 lost films
Lost comedy films
1920s American films
1920s English-language films